Juan José "Juanjo" Artero (born 27 June 1965) is a Spanish actor. Singularly remembered for his performance as teenager in Verano azul, he is also known for his performance in El barco or his 12-season-long performance as Charlie in El comisario.

Biography 
Artero was born in Madrid on 27 June 1965. His father was a physician who treated Franco during the latter's last rales. At age 14, Antonio Mercero cast him for the role of Javi in the popular series Verano azul, a role for which Artero is singularly remembered and which marked his acting career. Following the success of the series, Artero released a music album together with fellow Verano azul performer José Luis Fernández, going as "Pancho y Javi".  His adult television career consolidated with his 10-year-long performance as Charlie in El comisario. He has since starred in series such as El barco, Amar es para siempre and Servir y proteger.

His performance playing a 'good cop' in the 2011 film No Rest for the Wicked earned him a nomination to the Goya Award for Best Supporting Actor in 2012. Linked to Arenas de San Pedro, Artero purchased a plot in Hontanares, a hamlet belonging to the municipality, seeking to open a rural hotel. He suffered a pulmonary embolism in March 2019.

Filmography 

Television

Film

Awards and nominations

References 

1965 births
Living people
20th-century Spanish male actors
21st-century Spanish male actors
Spanish male television actors
Spanish male film actors
Spanish male child actors